Walters Bath No. 2 is a historic bath house located in southwest Baltimore, Maryland, United States. It is a small brick building of  laid in Flemish bond with black headers and Maryland limestone trimming. It was constructed in a very simplified form of Renaissance Revival architecture popularized at the turn of the 20th century. The bath house in the 900 block, Washington Boulevard (U.S. Route 1) in the southwest area of Pigtown / Washington Village, was built for the City of Baltimore by Henry Walters (1848–1931), who contributed four bath houses to the city. It was co-designed by architect George Archer (1848-1920), and constructed in 1901. Architect Archer was trained at Princeton University and lived in a landmark townhouse of white marble at the southeast corner of North Charles and West Madison Streets, facing Washington Place and the famous Washington Monument. The public bath system was abolished 60 years later, at the end of 1959 with the general extension of indoor plumbing and public water systems in the city's densely packed row houses residential neighborhoods.

Walters Bath No. 2 was listed on the National Register of Historic Places in 1979.

References

External links
, including photo from 1975, at Maryland Historical Trust

George Archer (architect)
Government buildings on the National Register of Historic Places in Baltimore
Government buildings completed in 1901
Renaissance Revival architecture in Maryland
Pigtown, Baltimore